Outline of Korea can refer to:
Outline of North Korea
Outline of South Korea